"Texas 1947" (originally spelled "Texas - 1947") is a song written by Guy Clark and originally recorded by Johnny Cash for his 1975 album Look at Them Beans.

Released as a single later in that year, the song peaked at number 35 on US Billboards country chart for the week of January 10, 1976. The B-side contained the song "I Hardly Ever Sing Beer Drinking Songs" from the same album.

Track listing

Charts

References

External links 
 "Texas 1947" on the Johnny Cash official website

Johnny Cash songs
1975 songs
1975 singles
Songs written by Guy Clark
Columbia Records singles